Charles Lafayette "Chas" Halsted (September 23, 1894 - February 19, 1968) was a Minnesota politician. Halsted was a member of the Minnesota House of Representatives  for more than 20 years. He was a candidate for governor of Minnesota in 1948.

Charles Halsted was born in Ellendale, North Dakota. he attended the North Dakota State Normal and Industrial School at Ellendale, graduating in 1914. He  moved to Brainerd, Minnesota in 1929 and opened Halsted's Grocery Store. Halsted served as town clerk in  Brainerd  in addition to his work as a grocer. He was first elected to the legislature in 1937, representing Brainerd. He served in the legislature until 1947. In 1948, he unsuccessfully challenged incumbent Republican Governor Luther Youngdahl as the Democratic-Farmer-Labor Party candidate in Minnesota's 1948 gubernatorial election.

In 1953, Halsted returned to the Minnesota House of Representatives, where he served until 1967.

Personal life
In 1926, Halsted was married to  Myrtle Gamble (1906-1968). The couple had with seven children. He died during 1968 in Crow Wing County, Minnesota and was buried at the Evergreen Cemetery in Brainerd, Minnesota.

References

External links

1894 births
1968 deaths
People from Ellendale, North Dakota
American Protestants
People from Brainerd, Minnesota
Democratic Party members of the Minnesota House of Representatives
20th-century American politicians